Sokuluk is a district of the Chüy Region in northern Kyrgyzstan. The administrative seat lies at Sokuluk village.

Population

Rural communities and villages
In total, Sokuluk District includes 1 town and 68 settlements in 19 rural communities. Each rural community includes one or several villages. The rural communities and settlements in the Sokuluk District are as follows:

 town Shopokov
 Asylbash (seat: Asylbash; incl. Kirov)
 At-Bashy (seat: Manas; incl. Ak-Jol, Lesnoye and Tört-Köl)
 Birinchi May (seat: Birinchi May; incl. Natsionalnoye and Panfilov)
 Frunze (seat: Frunze; incl. Komsomol, Ozernoye and Studencheskoye)
 Gavrilovka (seat: Gavrilovka; incl. Jangarach, Romanovka and Shalta)
 Jangy-Jer (seat: Jangy-Jer; incl. Verkhnevostochnoye, Zapadnoye, Zelenoye and Nizhnevostochnoye)
 Jangy-Pakhta (seat: Jangy-Pakhta; incl. Ak-Kashat, Zarya, May and Mirny)
 Kamyshanovka (seat: Kamyshanovka)
 Kaynazarova (seat: Chat-Köl; incl. Belek and Tüz)
 Krupskaya (seat: Sokuluk; incl. Jakynky Aral, Alysky Aral and Birinchi May)
 Kün-Tuu (seat: Kün-Tuu; incl. Dostuk, Kichi-Shalta, Shalta and Chong-Jar)
 Kyzyl-Tuu (seat: Kyzyl-Tuu; incl. Kara-Sakal, Malovodnoye, Novoye and Tokbay)
 Novopavlovka (seat: Novopavlovka; incl. Uchkun)
 Orok (seat: Jal; incl. Jogorku Orok, Kaltar, Kashka-Bash, Tömönkü Orok, Plodovoye, Sarban and Selektsionnoye)
 Saz (seat: Saz; incl. Konush)
 Sokuluk (seat: Sokuluk)
 Tömönkü Chüy (seat: Tömönkü Chüy; incl. Mirnoye, Sadovoye, Severnoye, Stepnoye and Taltak)
 Tösh-Bulak (seat: Tösh-Bulak; incl. Börülü and Chetindi)
 Voyenno-Antonovka (seat: Voyenno-Antonovka)

References 

Districts of Chüy Region